Der Zwerg (The Dwarf), Op. 17, is an opera in one act by Austrian composer Alexander von Zemlinsky to a libretto by Georg C. Klaren, freely adapted from the short story "The Birthday of the Infanta" by Oscar Wilde.

Composition history
Zemlinsky's choice of this story was a reflection of the end of his relationship with Alma Mahler, and the identification he felt with the drama's main character. He completed the short score in December 1919 and the orchestration in January 1921. The score was published by Universal Edition Vienna.

Performance history
The opera's premiere took place on 28 May 1922 at the Stadttheater Glockengasse in Cologne, Germany, under the baton of Otto Klemperer. Further productions followed in Vienna, Karlsruhe and Prague. Its last performance in Zemlinsky's lifetime was in September 1926 at the Städtische Oper in Berlin-Charlottenburg. The work runs for approximately 90 minutes and is usually paired with another work when performed.

In 1981, the Hamburg State Opera presented the first double-bill of Zemlinsky's two one-act operas Der Zwerg and Eine florentinische Tragödie.  Der Zwerg, however, was presented in an abridged version with a substantially altered libretto under the title The Birthday of the Infanta. The first modern performances of the opera as Zemlinsky intended were given in Cologne in February 1996 under the direction of James Conlon. In 2004 'Der Zwerg' was one of the 'Eight Little Greats' season given by Opera North throughout the north of England.

In 2013, the Opéra national de Lorraine in Nancy, who had previously presented Zemlinsky's Der König Kandaules and Eine florentinische Tragödie, continued its exploration of his work with Der Zwerg, presented under the French title Le nain with Erik Fenton as the Dwarf, Helena Juntuen as the Infanta, Eleanore Marguerre as Ghita and Pley Bryjak as Don Estoban. The staging was by Philipp Himmelmann with sets by Raimund Bauer and costumes by Bettina Walter.

The success of the performances in Nancy led to another adaptation in France in 2018 at the Opera de Rennes.

Numi Opera Theatre's inaugural season presented Der Zwerg with excerpts from Oscar Wilde's "Birthday of the Infanta" in Los Angeles in 2019.

In November 2022, Cologne Opera commemorated the centenary of the work's premiere there with a new production directed by Paul-Georg Dittrich and conducted by Lawrence Renes.

Roles

Instrumentation

3 flutes (2nd and 3rd doubling piccolo), 3 oboes (3rd doubling English horn), 3 clarinets in B-flat/A (2nd doubling E-flat clarinet, 3rd doubling bass clarinet), 3 bassoons (3rd doubling contrabassoon);
4 horns, 3 trumpets, 3 trombones, bass tuba;
timpani, percussion (cymbals, bass drum, side drum, triangle, tambourine, tam-tam, xylophone, glockenspiel), harp, celesta, guitar, mandolin;
strings

Offstage music: 3 trumpets; clarinet in C, bassoon, 2 horns, tambourine, mandoline, strings

Synopsis
A sultan has sent a dwarf as a present to the Infanta (Spanish princess) Donna Clara on her birthday. The dwarf is unaware of his physical deformity and becomes infatuated with the Infanta. He sings her a love song and imagines himself her brave knight. She toys with him and gives him a white rose as a present. Left alone, he accidentally uncovers a mirror and sees his own reflection for the first time. In great agitation, he tries to obtain a kiss from the Infanta, but she spurns him and calls him a monster. His heart broken, he dies clutching the white rose as the Infanta rejoins the party.

Recordings
 Soile Isokoski, David Kuebler, Iride Martinez, Andrew Collis, Juanita Lascarro, Machiko Obata, Anne Schwanewilms, Frankfurter Kantorei, Gürzenich-Orchester Köln, James Conlon. EMI Classics (live recording), 1996.
 Elena Tsallagova, David Butt Philip, Emily Magee, Philipp Jekal, Deutsche Oper Berlin conducted by Donald Runnicles, Tobias Kratzer, stage director. Video recording, Naxos Cat: NBD0108V, 2020.

References

Sources
 Antony Beaumont: Zemlinsky. Cornell University Press 2000.

Further reading
 Ulrich Wilker: "'Das Schönste ist scheußlich': Alexander Zemlinskys Operneinakter Der Zwerg", in Schriften des Wissenschaftszentrums Arnold Schönberg, volume 9. Böhlau, Wien/Köln/Weimar 2013.

External links

Operas by Alexander Zemlinsky
1922 operas
One-act operas
German-language operas
Operas
Operas based on works by Oscar Wilde